Bert Taylor or Tayler may refer to:
Bert Taylor (footballer, born 1900), Australian rules footballer for Fitzroy and coach of Geelong
Bert Taylor (footballer, born 1911), Australian footballer for Melbourne
Bert Leston Taylor (1866–1921), American writer
Bert Taylor, who runs BTC Racing
Bert Tayler (1887–1984), English cricketer
Bertram Taylor (Royal Navy officer) (1906-1970), British admiral

See also
Albert Taylor (disambiguation)
Robert Taylor (disambiguation)
Herbert Taylor (disambiguation)
Hubert G. Taylor, politician from New York